The 2009 FIBA Africa Basketball Club Championship (24th edition), was an international basketball tournament  held in Kigali, Rwanda, from December 13 to 22, 2009. The tournament, organized by FIBA Africa, and hosted by APR, was contested by 9 clubs split into 2 groups, the first four of which qualifying for the knock-out stage, quarter-finals, semifinals and final.
 
The tournament was won by Primeiro de Agosto from Angola, thus defending its title.

Draw

Squads

Qualification

Preliminary rounds
Times given below are in UTC+2.

Group A

Group B

Knockout stage

Quarter-finals

5th-8th place

Semifinals

7th place

5th place

Bronze medal game

Gold medal game

Final standings

Primeiro de Agosto rosterArmando Costa, Carlos Almeida, Felizardo Ambrósio, Filipe Abraão, Joaquim Gomes, Mário Correia, Miguel Lutonda, Rodrigo Mascarenhas, Vladimir Ricardino, Coach: Luís Magalhães

Statistical Leaders

All Tournament Team

See also 
2009 FIBA Africa Championship

References

External links 
 2009 FIBA Africa Champions Cup Official Website
 

2009 FIBA Africa Basketball Club Championship
2009 FIBA Africa Basketball Club Championship
2009 FIBA Africa Basketball Club Championship